The SOCSARGEN County Hospital is a 240-bed hospital in General Santos, in the southern part of Mindanao, Philippines. It is owned and operated by Mt. Matutum Medical Center, Inc.

See also
 List of hospitals in Philippines

References

 
 Hospitaldirectoryasia.com
 Socsargen County Hospital

External links
 SOCSARGEN County Hospital Website

Hospitals in the Philippines
Buildings and structures in General Santos